Josef Wastl (4 December 1892 – 11 October 1968) was an Austrian breaststroke swimmer. He competed in two events at the 1912 Summer Olympics.

References

External links
 

1892 births
1968 deaths
Austrian male breaststroke swimmers
Olympic swimmers of Austria
Swimmers at the 1912 Summer Olympics
Swimmers from Vienna
21st-century Austrian people